is a railway station in the city of Kurobe, Toyama, Japan, operated by the private railway operator Toyama Chihō Railway.

Lines

Station layout 
The station has one ground-level island platform serving two tracks. The station is unattended.

History
Urayama Station was opened on 5 November 1922.

Adjacent stations

Passenger statistics
In fiscal 2015, the station was used by 161 passengers daily.

Surrounding area 
Unatsuki Elementary School

See also
 List of railway stations in Japan

References

External links

 

Railway stations in Toyama Prefecture
Railway stations in Japan opened in 1922
Stations of Toyama Chihō Railway
Kurobe, Toyama